The Sight Unit Small Arms, Trilux, or  SUSAT, is a 4× telescopic sight, with tritium-powered illumination utilised at dusk or dawn. The full name of the current model is the SUSAT L9A1. The sight is not designed as a sniper sight, but is rather intended to be mounted on a variety of rifles and to be used by all infantrymen.  A similar device is the Advanced Combat Optical Gunsight.

Use

SUSAT was the primary sighting system for the British Army's SA80 series weapons and L108 and L110 light machine guns. It was phased out and replaced by ACOG and ELCAN sight units during mid-life upgrade programmes.
As of March 2019 it is still in use with much of the UK armed forces due to budgetary constraints.

It is (or has been) also used by the armies of Cameroon, Oman, Spain and Sweden, in assault rifles such as the Swedish Ak5B and the Spanish CETME LV, although after the replacement of the latter by the HK G36, those sights have been employed in Rheinmetall MG3 machine guns.

A similar unit known as the L2A2 SUIT Sight was used on the L1A1 SLR.

Reticle

The reticle of the SUSAT is of unusual design. Unlike the traditional crosshair layouts commonly used, which are in essence a cross intersecting the target, the SUSAT has a single obelisk-shaped post protruding from the bottom edge of the sight. This type of reticle is sometimes referred to as  the "German Post". This obscures the target at long range and the foreground. The reticle is tritium-illuminated for low-light condition aiming. The radioactive tritium light source has to be replaced every 8–12 years, since it gradually loses its brightness due to radioactive decay.
The L2A2 SUIT Sight uses a similar single post to the SUSAT, but protrudes from the top edge of the sight down to the middle of the field.

Manufacturing
SUSAT is constructed from a one-piece, pressure die-cast, aluminium body, into which the eyepiece, objective lens and prisms are fitted as assemblies.

The SUSAT sight was developed in the United Kingdom by Royal Armament Research Development Establishment (RARDE) and is manufactured by United Scientific Instruments and Avimo, now known as Thales Optics.

Specifications
SUSAT L9A1
Overall dimensions: (L x W x H): 145 x 60 x 55 mm
Weight: 417 grams
Magnification: 4×
Field of view: 10 degrees (177 mils)
Objective diameter: 25,5 mm
Exit pupil: 6.375 mm
Eye relief: 25 mm
Light permeability: >80%
Reticle illumination: Red tritium, glass ampoule
Illumination strength: Adjustable
Tritium ampoule lifetime: 8–12 years
Focus: −0.75 to −1.25 dioptres
Operational temperature: −46 to +71 °C
Range Settings: 100 to 600 meters (SUSAT L9A1) or 300 to 800 meters (SUSAT L12A1) in 100 m intervals  
NATO Stock Number (NSN): 1240-99-967-0947 (Sight Unit Small Arms Trilux (SUSAT) L12A1)

See also
C79 optical sight
ACOG Optical Sight
L2A2 SUIT Sight

External links
United Scientific Instruments—Official website
SIGHT UNIT SMALL ARMS TRILUX (SUSAT)

Firearm sights
British Army equipment
Military equipment introduced in the 1980s